Boquillas Canyon is a canyon in the Big Bend National Park. The canyon walls are 1,500 ft high and carved out of thick layers of limestone. The canyon length is a matter of some debate, with estimates ranging from 5 miles to 17 miles, depending on the chosen endpoint. The Rio Grande river currents through the canyon are rated up to Class II.

Etymology
Boquillas means "little mouths" in Spanish, perhaps a reference to the canyon's narrow mouth.

References

Big Bend National Park
Canyons and gorges of Texas